Woodlands is a residential neighbourhood in the southwest quadrant of Calgary, Alberta. The community is bordered by Fish Creek Provincial Park to the south, 24 Street SW to the west, Anderson Road SW to the north, and 14 Street SW to the east.  The Canyon Meadows Golf course is entirely contained within the boundaries of Woodlands.

Woodlands was established in 1976. It is represented in the Calgary City Council by the Ward 13 councillor.

Demographics

Residents in this community had a median household income of $71,234 in 2000, and there were 14.2% low income residents living in the neighbourhood. As of 2000, 22.9% of the residents were immigrants. A proportion of 11.6% of the buildings were condominiums or apartments, and 24.9% of the housing was used for renting.

See also
List of neighbourhoods in Calgary

References

External links
Woodcreek (Woodbine-Woodlands) Community Association

Neighbourhoods in Calgary